Killervision is the third studio album by New Zealand dub group, Salmonella Dub released in 1999.

The album received several awards at the 1999 New Zealand Music Awards.

Track listing
"Dragon"
"For The Love of It"
"Drifting"
"Crazy 80's"
"Peyote Dub"
"Justice"
"Johnny"
"No Worries 2000"
"Savage"
"Kaikoura Rim"

References

Salmonella Dub albums
1999 albums